The Ministry of Trade and Integration is a central executive body of the Government of Kazakhstan, formed by the decree of the President of Kazakhstan on 17 June 2019 with the transfer of functions and powers from the Ministry of National Economy in the field of formation and implementation of domestic and foreign trade policies, international economic integration, consumer protection; Ministry of Industry and Infrastructure Development in the field of technical regulation, standardization and ensuring the uniformity of measurements, and the Ministry of Foreign Affairs on coordination of activities in the field of export promotion.

History 
Formed with the transfer to him functions and powers:

 Of the Ministry of National Economy of the Republic of Kazakhstan in the field of the formation and implementation of internal and foreign trade policies, international economic integration, consumer rights protection;
Of the Ministry of Industry and Infrastructure Development of the Republic of Kazakhstan in the field of technical regulation, standardization and ensuring unity of measurements; 
Ministry of Foreign Affairs of the Republic of Kazakhstan for coordination of activities in the field of export promotion.

Functions 

 Development and regulation of foreign trade activities, international trade and economic relations, including regulating international economic integration;
Development and promotion of exports of not raw goods and services;
Development and regulation of internal trade, improvement of trade infrastructure, development of stock exchange and electronic commerce;
Implementation of intersectoral coordination of action of state bodies in the areas of consumer rights protection, technical regulation, standardization and ensuring measurement uniformity, including strategic, control, realization and regulatory functions.

References

2019 establishments in Kazakhstan
Trade
Ministries established in 2019